is a Japanese horror manga series written and illustrated by Junji Ito. Tomie was Ito's first published work he originally submitted to Monthly Halloween, a shōjo magazine in 1987, which led to him winning the Kazuo Umezu award.

The manga has been adapted into a live-action film series with nine installments to date, an anthology television series released in 1999, and a streaming television series was in development for Quibi before the service was shut down.

Plot
The manga centers on the titular character: a mysterious, beautiful woman named Tomie Kawakami, identified by her sleek black hair and a beauty mark below her left eye.

Tomie acts like a succubus, possessing an undisclosed power to make any man fall in love with her. Through her mere presence, or through psychological and emotional manipulation, she drives these people into jealous rages that often lead to brutal acts of violence. Men kill each other over her, and women are driven to insanity as well —though there are some who are strong enough to resist her. Tomie is inevitably killed time and time again, only to regenerate and spread her curse to other victims, making her effectively immortal. Her origins are never explained, though it is suggested by some older men in the series that she has existed long before the events of the manga; in Boy, she is revealed to have known her future teacher Satoru Takagi since he was a child.

Each story showcases various characters that encounter Tomie in her many (often hideous) forms, with some having their own arcs or returning in later chapters. Tomie's regenerative abilities (partly fuelled by cannibalism and assimilation) are also showcased: aside from recovering quickly from gruesome and seemingly mortal wounds, she can also replicate herself by sprouting unnaturally from any part of her body, whether it be from severed limbs, organs, or even her spilled blood. Radiation accelerates her healing/regeneration process. Her cells are also capable of transforming a victim into a Tomie via an organ transplant. Multiple characters are even driven to dismember her corpse, unwittingly allowing more Tomie copies to grow and spread throughout the world. Even locks of her hair are dangerous, burrowing into its victims' brain to possess them, and eventually killing them when it grows wildly within the body. It is also shown that even if Tomie's body is not injured, her body will attempt to sprout another Tomie through tumorous growths, usually when she is emotionally stressed. Some Tomie copies, however, cannot stand one another; one is seen killing one personally, while others order it done through the boys they seduce/enslave. Fire is the only known method to destroy a Tomie for good, though only if the flesh is completely carbonized.

The next story arc, beginning as a prequel, reveals that a baby girl can grow naturally into a Tomie via a blood injection and that she can age if she has not yet copied herself. The man responsible for these injections is a horribly burnt stranger — once a supermodel disgraced by a Tomie in his past — who seeks revenge by making one of these "natural" Tomies old and ugly. He manages to encase a Tomie named "Ayaka" in a block of cement with the help of Ayaka's older sister. The two then wait for many years — endlessly hearing her tormented cries — before finally breaking the block, revealing that Tomie had somehow escaped through a tiny crack, her apparent wailing being nothing more than wind blowing through the hollow block.

An arc released exclusively with the DVD release of the Junji Ito Collection, titled Tomie: Takeover, features Tomie encountering a man capable of body-switching, who finds her various abilities difficult to handle.

A four-page crossover arc with Souichi Tsujii, titled Souichi Possessed, was released in 2018. In the story, the titular's Souichi's older brother Koichi tells a younger Tomie of his attempted mischief of a brother's encounter with a different elderly Tomie, the arc serving as the prologue to a larger confrontation between the pair, as the younger Tomie requests an introduction.

Publication

Tomie is published by Asahi Sonorama and appeared as a serial in the manga magazine Monthly Halloween from 1987 to 2000. Tomie received one bound volume in February 1996, titled . Two volumes were collected into the overarching series  as volume 1 and 2 of the series. Asahi Sonorama released an omnibus volume in February 2000 titled, . ComicsOne released both volumes on April 1, 2001, with flipped artwork (read left-to-right).

A second series titled  was serialized in Nemuki and was collected into a single bound volume titled  and released in March 2001. Tomie was re-released again as part of  series. This version was also released in two volumes with the addition of the chapters originally released in Tomie Again. Dark Horse Comics released this version in its original right-to-left format.

Viz Media announced their license to the series on March 26, 2016. They published it as a single hardcover volume, similar to their releases of Gyo and Uzumaki.

Adaptations

Tomie has been adapted into a series of Japanese horror films released between 1999 and 2011. There are to date nine films in the series.

Most of the manga stories occur during the dark of night for its sense of eeriness, and the films generally follow suit.

Two episodes were adapted for the Junji Ito Collection.

Tomie's sexuality in films is more ambiguous. In the manga, Tomie's attitude towards women seems to range between thinly-veiled hostility and outright murderous rage (unless she stands to profit from them), while the film incarnation is known to seduce women as well as men.

In July 2019, Alexandre Aja was announced to be developing a web television series adaptation of Tomie for Quibi, in conjunction with Sony Pictures Television and Universal Content Productions, with David Leslie Johnson-McGoldrick serving as writer and executive producer and Hiroki Shirota on board as co-producer. In July 2020, Adeline Rudolph was announced to have been cast as Tomie. In October 2020, it was announced that Quibi is shutting down on December 1, 2020, leaving the fate of the series in question.

Reception
Junji Ito won the 1989 Kazuo Umezu Prize for his work on Tomie. Since then, the manga has spawned a cult following and is still generally praised by fans and critics alike.

See also
The Babysitter
Carrie
Eel Girl
Girl from Nowhere
Harpya
"Jenifer"
Jennifer's Body
"Shambleau"
Tamara

References

External links
 

 
Asahi Sonorama manga
ComicsOne titles
Dark Horse Comics titles
Psychological horror anime and manga
Shōjo manga
Succubi in popular culture
Supernatural anime and manga
Viz Media manga